Helston RFC is a rugby union club in Cornwall which has been in existence since 1965. They currently play in Cornwall League 2, following relegation from Cornwall League 1 in 2018–19.  They are famous for the 1995–96 side that managed to reach the final of the RFU Pilkington Shield, and are one of only three Cornish club sides to have played in a competitive final at Twickenham (alongside Mount's Bay RFC and the Cornish Pirates).

History
Helston RFC was formed in 1965, when a group of men within the town of Helston decided that rugby had a place within the local community. Their first ever game took place against Penryn 2nd XV, which resulted in a 14–9 loss. However, their first victory would occur a few games later against the Newquay Hornets. The club would go on to win several junior cups throughout the 1980s, with victories over such sides as Bodmin, Liskeard-Looe, St. Agnes and Bude, and have also won the Cornwall 2 league title on four occasions, more than any other club.

In 1995–96 season, the club would achieve an incredible feat. They reached the final of the Pilkington Shield (now the Powergen Vase), which is some achievement for a small club as it was the largest club rugby competition in the world, with 501 teams competing. They eventually lost at Twickenham on the 4 May 1996, against Medicals RFC (16–6) from Newcastle.
Following on from their previous successes in cup competitions, and despite a difficult season on the field, Helston made the final of the CRFU Skinners Junior Cup in season 2009–10 against Roseland. The final score was 23–19 to Roseland but Helston held their heads up high.

King George V Playing Field 
The King George V Playing Field has been in use by the club since the club played its first match in 1965. It is owned by Cornwall Council. Until recently, the facilities at the site were extremely poor by any standards. However, on the 20 April 2006, a new clubhouse was opened which included two top quality changing rooms and a brand new bar facility. It is also the venue for an annual road race An Resek Helys (The Race for Helston). 
  Current supporter capacity is approximately 2,500, all of which is standing.

Season summary

Honours

Cornwall Clubs Cup winners (6): 1980–81, 1984–85, 1985–86, 1987–88, 1988–89, 1990–91 
Cornwall 2 champions (5): 1990–91, 1992–93, 2003–04, 2005–06, 2017–18
Pilkington Shield runners up: 1995-96
CRFU Cornwall Club Plate winners: 2016-17

Notable former players
 Ricky Pellow - started his career with the club before playing at a higher level with Worcester Warriors and Bath, who he won the Heineken Cup with in 1998.  Also achieved multiple caps for Cornwall.

Notes

See also

Cornish rugby

References

External links
 Medicals RFC
 Helston RFC
 Trelawney's Army, Cornish rugby website

Cornish rugby union teams
English rugby union teams
Rugby clubs established in 1965
Sports clubs in Cornwall
Helston